Bengough may refer to:

Places 

 Bengough, Saskatchewan, a town in Canada
 Bengough (electoral district), a provincial electoral district in Saskatchewan
 Rural Municipality of Bengough No. 40, Saskatchewan, a rural municipality in Canada

People 

 Harcourt Mortimer Bengough (1837–1922), a British soldier
 John Wilson Bengough (1851–1923), a Canadian cartoonist
 Benny Bengough (1898–1968), an American baseball player